Duri is an Austronesian language of Sulawesi, Indonesia. It is the prestige variety of the Massenrempulu languages.

In 2010 123,000 people spoke this language. It is listed as a 'threatened' language by Ethnologue.

References

Languages of Sulawesi
South Sulawesi languages